The New York City Police Department (NYPD) is structured into numerous bureaus and units. As a whole, the NYPD is headed by the Police Commissioner, a civilian administrator appointed by the Mayor, with the senior sworn uniformed officer of the service titled "Chief of Department".  The Police Commissioner appoints the First Deputy Commissioner as the department's second-in-command and the Chief of Department as the department's highest ranking uniformed officer. The commissioner also appoints a number of deputy and assistant commissioners who do not have operational command and are solely for support and administrative function.  The department is divided into twenty bureaus, six of which are enforcement bureaus. Each enforcement bureau is further subdivided into sections, divisions, and units, and into patrol boroughs, precincts, and detective squads.  Each bureau is commanded by a bureau chief (such as the Chief of Patrol and the Chief of Housing). There are also a number of specialized units (such as the Technical Assistance Response Unit) that are not part of any of the bureaus and report to the Chief of the Department.

Leadership

The department is headed by and under the control of a civilian Police Commissioner, who is appointed by the Mayor of New York City. The current Police Commissioner is Keechant Sewell.

The department's executive staff is divided into two areas: civilian and uniformed. The civilian staff is responsible for support services and departmental management, while uniformed officers investigate crimes and conduct law enforcement operations.

 The First Deputy Commissioner, who is the department's second-in-command, oversees the civilian deputy commissioners and is the department's chief administrative officer and outranks all uniformed officers (including the Chief of Department). The deputy commissioners do not have authority over the department; the only members of the board of commissioners who have command authority over the department are the Commissioner and First Deputy Commissioner. All other commissioners have purely administrative and support duties. The current First Deputy Commissioner is Edward Caban.
 The Chief of the Department is appointed by and serves at the pleasure of the Commissioner and supervises uniformed police commanders. The chief is the department's highest ranking uniformed police officer and the lead official responsible for operations. The current chief is Jeffrey Maddrey.

Office of the Police Commissioner
 Commissioner
 Chief of Staff
 First Deputy Commissioner
 Deputy Commissioner, Collaborative Policing
 Deputy Commissioner, Counsel to Police Commissioner
 Deputy Commissioner, Department Advocate
 Deputy Commissioner, Employee Relations
 Deputy Commissioner, Equity & Inclusion
 Deputy Commissioner, Information Technology
 Deputy Commissioner, Intelligence & Counterterrorism
 Deputy Commissioner, Internal Affairs
 Deputy Commissioner, Labor Relations
 Deputy Commissioner, Legal Matters
 Deputy Commissioner, Management and Budget
Deputy Commissioner, Public Information
 Deputy Commissioner, Strategic Initiatives
 Deputy Commissioner, Community Partnerships
 Deputy Commissioner, Executive Communications
 Deputy Commissioner, Support Services
 Deputy Commissioner, Trials
 Deputy  Commissioner, Community Affairs

Office of the Chief of Department
 Chief of Department
 Chief of Staff
 Chief of Operations
 Chief of Community Affairs
 Chief of Counterterrorism
 Chief of Crime Control Strategies
 Chief of Detective Bureau
 Chief of Housing Bureau
 Chief of Intelligence Bureau
 Chief of Patrol Services Bureau
 Chief of Special Operations
 Chief of Transit Bureau
 Chief of Transportation Bureau
 Chief of Personnel Bureau
 Chief of Training Bureau 
 Chief of Collaborative Policing
 Chief of OMAP
 Chief of Risk Management Bureau
 Chief of Strategic Initiatives
 Chief of Internal Affairs Bureau
 Chief of Interagency Operations

Structure
The following is the department's hierarchy (with rank insignia):
As of December, 2022:

 Police Commissioner of the City of New York – Keechant Sewell  / Chief of Staff
 First Deputy Police Commissioner of the City of New York – Edward A. Caban  / Chief of Staff: Assistant Chief - Raul Pintos 
 Commanding Officer of First Deputy Commissioner's Office Assistant Chief
 Deputy Commissioner, Employee Relations – Lisa D. White 
 Commanding Officer of Ceremonial Unit - Lieutenant  
 Commanding Officer of Chaplains Unit - Lieutenant Steven A. Jerome 
 Deputy Commissioner, Community Partners – Chauncey Parker 
 Deputy Commissioner, Community Affairs - Mark T. Stewart 
 Executive Officer of Community Affairs: Assistant Chief 
 Commanding Officer of School Safety Division – Deputy Chief  
 Deputy Commissioner, Department Advocate – Amy Litwin 
 Deputy Commissioner, Equity and Inclusion –  Wendy Garcia 
 Deputy Commissioner, Information Technology –  Matthew Fraser 
 Deputy Commissioner, Intelligence & Counterterrorism – John Miller 
 Deputy Commissioner, Labor Relations – Edward Delatorre   
 Deputy Commissioner, Legal Matters – Ernest F. Hart 
 Deputy Commissioner, Management and Budget – Kristine Ryan 
 Deputy Commissioner, Public Information – Julian Phillips 
 Deputy Commissioner, Executive Communications – William W. Andrews 
 Deputy Commissioner, Trials – Rosemarie Maldonado 
 Commanding Officer of Criminal Justice Bureau - Deputy Chief 

 Chief of Department – Jeffrey B. Maddrey 
Chief of Operations: Bureau Chief - ? 
 Commanding Officer of Operations, Chief of Department's Office: Assistant Chief 
 Commanding Officer of Technical Assistance Response Unit (TARU): 
 Commanding Officer of Domestic Violence Unit - Deputy Chief  
 Bureau of Intelligence and Counterterrorism, Bureau Chief - Thomas P. Galati / Executive Officer, Inspector - Roberto Rios
 Chief of the Counterterrorism Division, Assistant Chief - Judith R. Harrison / Executive Officer, 
 Chief of Critical Response Command, Deputy Chief - Scott A. Shanley / Executive Officer, 
 Chief of the Intelligence Division: Deputy Chief - John B. Hart / Executive Officer, Inspector - Janice L. Holmes
 Bureau of Crime Control Strategies: Bureau Chief - Michael P. Lipetri 
 Bureau of Transportation Services: Bureau Chief - Kim Y. Royster 
 Commanding Officer of Traffic Enforcement District, Deputy Chief - Michael Pilecki
 Commanding Officer of Traffic Operations District, Inspector - Scott Hanover
 Commanding Officer of Highway Patrol District, Inspector - Sylvester Ge
 Bureau of Interagency Operations: Bureau Chief - Theresa C. Tobin  
 Bureau of Special Operations: Bureau Chief - Wilson Aramboles  / Executive Officer: Deputy Chief - Gerard V. Dowling 
 Chief of Strategic Response Group, Deputy Chief - John J. D'Adamo 
 Chief of Emergency Services Unit, Assistant Chief - Carlos Valdez 
 Commanding Officer of Harbor Unit and SCUBA Team: Inspector - Anthony J. Russo 
 Commanding Officer of Mounted Unit: Deputy Inspector - Barry Gelbman 
Commanding Officer of Aviation Unit: Deputy Inspector - Louis F. Soviero 
 Bureau of Strategic Initiatives: Bureau Chief - Isa M. Abbassi 
 Bureau of Risk Management: Bureau Chief - Matthew V. Pontillo 
 Bureau of Support Services, Bureau Chief - Galen D. Frierson 
 Fleet Services Division, Inspector - Scott A. Olexa 
 Bureau of Labour Relations: Bureau Chief -  
 Bureau of Internal Affairs, Bureau Chief - Miguel A. Iglesias / Executive Officer,
 Bureau of Detectives, Bureau Chief - James W. Essig  / Executive Officer,  
 Commanding Officer of Citywide Investigations Division: Assistant Chief - Joseph E. Kenny 
 Manhattan South Detective Borough Commander: Assistant Chief - Michael J. Baldassano  / Executive Officer: Deputy Chief - ? 
 Manhattan North Detective Borough Commander: Deputy Chief - Brian S. McGee  / Executive Officer: Inspector - Peter A. Fiorillo 
 Brooklyn South Detective Borough Commander: Deputy Chief - Joseph M. Gulotta  / Brooklyn South Detective Borough Executive Officer: Inspector - ? 
 Brooklyn North Detective Borough Commander: Deputy Chief - ?  / Brooklyn North Detective Borough Executive Officer: Inspector - ? 
 Queens South Detective Borough Commander: Deputy Chief - Jerry P. O'Sullivan  / Queens South Detective Borough Executive Officer: Inspector - ? 
 Queens North Detective Borough Commander: Deputy Chief - Julie L. Morrill  / Queens North Detective Borough Executive Officer: Inspector - ? 
 Bronx Detective Borough Commander: Deputy Chief - Timothy J. McCormack  / Bronx Detective Borough Executive Officer: Inspector - ? 
 Staten Island Detective Borough Commander: Inspector - Mark C. Molinari  / Staten Island Detective Borough Executive Officer: Captain - ? 
 Real Time Crime Center Commander: Unknown - ?
 Special Victims Division Commander: Deputy Chief - Carlos Ortiz 
 Bureau of Personnel: Bureau Chief - Donna G. Jones 
 Commanding Officer of Chief of Personnel's Office - Inspector Peter Venice 
Commanding Officer of Personnel Orders Division - Inspector John Benoit 
 Bureau of Housing: Bureau Chief - Martine N. Materasso 
 Bureau of Training: Bureau Chief - Juanita N. Holmes 
 Commanding Officer of the Police Academy: Deputy Chief - Peter Fortune  / Executive Officer of the Police Academy / 
 Commanding Officer of Recruit Training Section: Inspector - Rhonda O'Reilly-Bovell 
Commanding Officer of Police Cadet Corps: Inspector - ? 
 Bureau of Transit, Bureau Chief - Michael M. Kemper 
 Bureau of Patrol, Bureau Chief - John M. Chell 
 Manhattan South Patrol Borough Commander: Assistant Chief - James N. McCarthy  / Executive Officer: Deputy Chief - ? 
 Manhattan North Patrol Borough Commander: Assistant Chief - Olufunmilola F. Obe  / Executive Officer: Deputy Chief - Steven Ortiz 
 Brooklyn South Patrol Borough Commander: Assistant Chief - Charles E. McEvoy  / Executive Officer: Deputy Chief - ? 
 Brooklyn North Patrol Borough Commander: Assistant Chief - Scott M. Henderson  / Executive Officer: Deputy Chief - ? 
 Queens South Patrol Borough Commander: Assistant Chief - Kevin Williams  / Executive Officer: Deputy Chief - ? 
 Queens North Patrol Borough Commander: Assistant Chief - Christine Bastedenbeck  / Executive Officer: Deputy Chief - ? 
 The Bronx Patrol Borough Commander: Assistant Chief - Philip P Rivera  / Executive Officer: Deputy Chief - ? 
 Staten Island Patrol Borough Commander: Assistant Chief - Gin Y. Yee  / Executive Officer: Deputy Chief - ? 
 Auxiliary Police Section Commander: Inspector - Emmanuel Gonzalez

Patrol Services Bureau
 Commanding Officer of Patrol Services: Bureau Chief - John M Chell 
 Executive Officer of Patrol Services: Inspector - Tanya Kinsella

Overview
The Patrol Services Bureau is one of the most visible units of the NYPD. The bureau plans, directs, and coordinates the department's uniformed officers in law enforcement patrol operations. Under the Chief of Patrol, there are eight borough commands, each headed by an assistant chief.  While each of the boroughs has at least one patrol borough command, the boroughs of Manhattan, Queens and Brooklyn have two commands due to their sizes. The borough commands exercise authority over the various seventy-seven police precincts.
 Patrol borough chiefs:
 Manhattan South Patrol Borough Commander: Assistant Chief - James N. McCarthy  / Executive Officer: Deputy Chief - 
 Manhattan North Patrol Borough Commander: Assistant Chief - Olufunmilola F. Obe  / Executive Officer: Deputy Chief - 
 Brooklyn South Patrol Borough Commander: Assistant Chief -   / Executive Officer: Deputy Chief - 
 Brooklyn North Patrol Borough Commander: Assistant Chief -   / Executive Officer: Deputy Chief - 
 Queens South Patrol Borough Commander: Assistant Chief - Kevin Williams  / Executive Officer: Deputy Chief - 
 Queens North Patrol Borough Commander: Assistant Chief -   / Executive Officer: Deputy Chief - 
 Staten Island Patrol Borough Commander: Assistant Chief - Gin Y. Yee  / Executive Officer: Deputy Chief - 
 Bronx Patrol Borough Commander: Assistant Chief - Philip P Rivera  / Executive Officer: Deputy Chief -

Police precincts
Each patrol borough is composed of precincts. Each precinct is responsible for safety and law enforcement within a designated geographic area. Police units based in these precincts patrol and respond to emergencies.

Staten Island now has four precincts: the 120th, 121st (new as of 2013), 122nd, and 123rd.

Queens South began operating a satellite for the large 105th precinct in the southern part of the precinct next to the Rosedale LIRR station in July 2007. This building was, until then, the quarters for the Queens South Task Force, the Queens South Auto-Larceny Unit, the Queens South Anti-Crime Unit, the Queens South Evidence Collection Team, and the Detective Bureau's Queens Major Case Squad. A new 116th precinct is being constructed on the site of the parking lot next door to the satellite.

Auxiliary Police

 Commanding Officer of Auxiliary Police Section: Inspector - Emmanuel Gonzalez 

The NYPD has a reserve police force known as the Auxiliary Police. NYPD Auxiliary Police officers complete a training academy designated by the NYS Municipal Police Training Council as "part time peace officer" training course.  In accordance with New York State law auxiliary police officers are equipped with police batons.  They also carry police radios and in accordance with NYC administrative code they carry handcuffs. They assist the police department with uniformed patrols and provide crowd and vehicular control at special events, accidents, and fire scenes.

Special Operations Bureau
 Commanding Officer of Special Operations: Bureau Chief - Harry J. Wedin 
 Executive Officer of Special Operations: Deputy Chief - Gerard V. Dowling

Emergency Service Unit

 Commanding Officer of Emergency Services Unit: Assistant Chief - Wilson Ambroles 

The Emergency Service Unit is a component of the Special Operations Bureau of the New York City Police Department. The Emergency Services Unit (ESU) provides specialized support and advanced equipment to other NYPD units; its members are cross-trained in multiple disciplines of tactical and rescue work- primarily traditional Special Weapons And Tactics (SWAT) duties, physical rescue including vehicle accident extrication, water rescue, structural collapse rescue, the safe handling and subduing of Emotionally Disturbed Persons (EDPs) that include suicidal jumpers on buildings and bridges, and perform basic mechanical & electrical skills that patrol officers are not equipped to handle. As part of its water rescue capability, its members are all rescue divers and it maintains a fleet of jet skis and motorized Zodiac inflatable boats strategically stationed around the city for deployment when needed. The ESU Canine Unit deploys patrol/apprehension and bloodhound dogs to perform searches for perpetrators and missing persons.

Aviation Unit

 Commanding Officer of Aviation Unit – Inspector 
Founded in 1928, it claims the distinction of being the oldest police aviation unit in the world, but there is a competing claim from the London Metropolitan Police Service ("The Met"). Based at Floyd Bennett Field in Brooklyn, the Aviation Unit responds to various emergencies and tasks, supporting other units of the N.Y.P.D. Among its capabilities are the deployment of divers for water rescues. From a standing start, the unit claims it can be anywhere in the five boroughs within 15 minutes, but this has been disputed and is dependent on weather conditions and air traffic congestion.

Since 9/11 the department has undertaken a major overhaul of the Aviation Unit. Equipped exclusively with Bell helicopters, it operates three Bell 412 helicopters, four Bell 429 helicopters, and one Bell 407 helicopter used for training. The department has also purchased a state-of-the-art helicopter flight simulator, so officers can practice flying without actually having to take up a helicopter. In 2011 the department said they had .50 caliber machine guns capable of shooting down light planes.

The department also operated a Cessna 208 Caravan through a Preparedness Grant from FEMA, which is used for monitoring radiological material.

Famed US cyclist Mile-a-Minute Murphy claimed to be the first police officer able to fly a plane in the US (possibly the entire world) as of 1914 as a member of the NYPD. He envisioned the use of airplanes to fight crime around the same time, though the Aviation Unit came into being 11 years after Murphy retired.

Harbor Unit and Scuba Team

 Commanding Officer of Harbor Unit: Inspector - Anthony J Russo 

On March 15, 1858, five members of the New York City Police Department rowed out into New York Harbor to combat piracy aboard merchant ships lying at anchor. The NYPD Harbor Unit has existed ever since, protecting life and property. With hundreds of miles of inland waterways to cover, the unit operates over 36 boats from four bases.

For underwater work, the department used to contract with private diving companies when weapons or other evidence had to be recovered from the bottom of New York's many rivers and waterways. In the early 1970s, however, the Harbor Unit formed a specialized scuba team that today numbers around 30 officers. Unlike many police dive units, whose members dive only part-time, NYPD divers are assigned to the unit full-time. (The exception are some scuba-trained officers in regular patrol units who are detailed to the team temporarily during the busy summer months.) In addition to the normal duties of evidence recovery, the Scuba Team's mission has expanded since 9/11 to include a counter-terrorism role. For air-sea rescue work, the Harbor Unit keeps two divers assigned to the Aviation Unit 24 hours a day, seven days per week, all year round.  These divers will work with their counterparts in the FDNY, who arrive at incidents by fireboat or rescue company.

Mounted Unit

 Commanding Officer of Mounted Unit: Deputy Inspector - Barry M. Gelbman 

The NYPD Mounted Unit was created in 1858 and is used today in the Patrol units. The unit has 70 uniformed officers and supervisors and approximately 45 horses. The unit is divided into 4 "Troops"; Troop B (Manhattan), Troop D (Bronx), Troop E (Brooklyn), and Troop F (Queens).

Strategic Response Group

Commanding Officer of Strategic Response Group:

The Strategic Response Groups are organized within each borough and specialize in rapid mobilization. The Strategic Response Group responds to citywide mobilizations, civil disorders and major events with equipment and trained teams. They maintain order by implementing effective crime and crowd control strategies.

The Strategic Response Group conducts daily counterterrorism deployments in conjunction with other department units based upon current intelligence and threat assessments. They identify and suppress terrorist surveillance of targets through mobile deployment teams. They respond quickly and decisively to terrorist incidents or threats.

The Strategic Response Group can be deployed to precincts and zones to supplement patrol resources or other Department initiatives.

The Strategic Response Group is organized as follows:
SRG 1 Manhattan
SRG 2 Bronx
SRG 3 Brooklyn
SRG 4 Queens
SRG 5 Staten Island
SRG Disorder Control Unit
SRG Bicycle Squad

Transit Bureau

 Commanding Chief Officer of Transit: Bureau Chief - Jason K. Wilcox  
 Executive Officer of Transit: Deputy Chief - Christine Bastedenbeck 

The NYPD Transit Bureau is a part of the NYPD that patrols and responds to emergencies within the New York City transit system. Its responsibility includes the New York City Subway network in Manhattan, the Bronx, Brooklyn, and Queens.  However, there are certain units that have citywide responsibilities such as the Homeless Outreach Unit and the Vandals Task Force.

The Transit Bureau is divided into Transit Borough Commands. These Borough Commands generally follow the boundaries of the city's geographical boroughs, although there are some notable exceptions.  Since there are no subways on Staten Island, there are only four Transit Boroughs: Queens, Bronx, Brooklyn, and Manhattan. Each Transit Borough is further divided into Transit Districts.

As a general rule, each Borough is commanded by an Inspector while Transit Districts tend to be commanded by Captains. The NYPD Detective Bureau investigates all crimes that occur in Transit. Each borough office has assigned detectives from the Detective Bureau similar to the Precinct Detective Squad. As of June 15, 2006 all detectives assigned to investigate transit crimes fall under a unified command (Central Robbery Section) of the Detective Bureau's Special Investigations Division.
Transit District 1,2,3,4 Manhattan
Transit District 11,12 Bronx
Transit District 20,23 Queens
Transit District 30,32,33,34 Brooklyn

Housing Bureau

 Commanding Officer of Housing – Bureau Chief  Kathleen M. O'Reilly  

The Housing Bureau is responsible for providing the security and delivery of police services to 420,000 residents, employees and guests of public housing developments throughout New York City. They are stationed in Police Service Areas (PSA), which are almost identical to police precincts, with nine PSAs in total located throughout the five boroughs. Officers often do interior patrols, making sure illegal activity does not take place in the halls, stairways, or the roof.
Police Service Area 1 Brooklyn covering 60,61,63,69,76,78 precincts
Police Service Area 2 Brooklyn covering 73,75,77 precincts 
Police Service Area 3 Brooklyn covering 79,81,84,88,90 precincts 
Police Service Area 4 Manhattan covering 5,7,9,10 precincts 
Police Service Area 5 Manhattan covering 23,25,28 precincts 
Police Service Area 6 Manhattan covering 24,26,32 precincts
Police Service Area 7 Bronx covering 40,42 precincts 
Police Service Area 8 Bronx covering 43,45,47 precincts 
Police Service Area 9 Queens covering 103,107,113,114 precincts

Transportation Bureau

 Commanding Officer of Transportation – Bureau Chief Kim Royster 

The Transportation Bureau's responsibilities include traffic enforcement, traffic management, and highway safety.

Special units within the New York City Police Department Transportation Bureau include the Highway District, Traffic Management Center, Traffic Operations District, Citywide Traffic Task Force and the Traffic Enforcement District.

Highway District

 Commanding Officer of Highway Patrol District: Inspector - Sylvester Ge 

The New York City Police Department Highway District is a specialized unit under the auspices of the NYPD's Transportation Bureau primarily responsible for patrolling and maintaining traffic safety on limited-access highways within New York City.  The District's other duties and roles include collision investigations, advanced driver and radar training for NYPD officers, field sobriety testing, dignitary and parade escorts, hazardous material and truck traffic enforcement, anti-drag racing programs, and anti-terrorist checkpoints at key bridges and intersections in the city.

The Transportation Bureau also included the Transit Division from 1997 to 1999. That division was upgraded to bureau status, as it once had from 1995 to 1997 and again in 1999.

Traffic Enforcement District

Commanding Officer of Traffic Enforcement District – Deputy Inspector Brian O' Sullivan

NYPD Traffic Enforcement has many duties including directing traffic, enforcing parking regulations, towing vehicles, providing highway assistance, and enforcing laws related to roadway construction. The personnel in Traffic Enforcement is referred to as Traffic Enforcement Agents (TEAs), and wears uniforms similar to the uniform worn by School Safety Agents, although with a distinctive white uniform cap. There are four levels of Traffic Enforcement Agents with each level handling different duties. Level 1 agents focus on parking regulation enforcement, Level 2 agents focus on directing traffic, Level 3 agents focus on towing vehicles, and Level 4 perform a variety of duties, including specialized enforcement such as street construction permits or truck weight regulations. Only TEAs of Level 4 status have peace officer powers, which allows them to carry handcuffs and make warrantless arrests. TEAs of Level 1–3 status have the authority to issue summonses for parking and moving violations, but no other authority. Older Traffic Enforcement vehicles are dark blue or black with white decals and newer vehicles are white with light blue decals. Like School Safety Agents, non-supervisor TEAs wear badges that are oval with an eagle on top, in contrast to the shield worn by police officers and the seven-point star worn by Auxiliary officers.

Detective Bureau
 Commanding Officer of Detective – Bureau Chief James Essig

Crime Scene Unit
Commanding Officer of Crime Scene Unit: ? - ?

The Crime Scene Unit (CSU) is a unit within the Forensic Investigations Division of the New York City Police Department Detective Bureau.

The Crime Scene Unit is responsible for forensic investigations of all homicides and sexual assaults, as well as other crimes as deemed necessary by an investigating supervisor.  Members of the Crime Scene Unit assist the precinct detectives in the processing of a crime scene as well as determining the proper routing of evidence between the NYC Office of the Chief Medical Examiner, the NYPD Police Lab and the NYPD Property Clerk.

The Crime Scene Unit is composed of NYPD detectives (or occasionally police officers that are awaiting their promotion to detective), not civilian technicians like crime scene units in other parts of the U.S. Generally these detectives come from an Evidence Collection Team which is operated at the borough level. The Crime Scene Unit covers all of the boroughs of New York City but is staffed with less than 1% of the total number of detectives in the NYPD.

The Crime Scene Unit has many tools to process a crime scene, including the materials needed to develop fingerprints, cast footwear and tire impressions, follow the trajectory of bullets fired through windows and the chemicals necessary to observe blood under special lighting conditions that would otherwise be invisible to the naked eye. The unit is also trained to process a crime scene in a hazardous environment, for example following a nuclear, biological or chemical attack.

Popular culture

The CSU is the primary focus of the CBS TV drama CSI: NY, and has been occasionally featured on both CSI: Miami and CSI: Cyber. CSU is also featured on Castle, Law & Order, Law & Order: Special Victims Unit, Law & Order: Criminal Intent, and Law & Order: Trial By Jury, though it is not the primary focus of these series.

Special Victims Division
 Commanding Officer of Special Victims Division: Deputy Chief Carlos Ortiz 

The Special Victims Division created in 2003 oversees all the borough Special Victims Squads.  The Special Victims Division is part of the New York City Police Department Detective Bureau and investigates the following types of cases:
 Any child under 13 years of age that is the victim of any sex crime or attempted sex crime by any person.
 Any child under 11 years of age who is the victim of abuse by a parent or person legally responsible for the care of the child.
 Any victim of rape or attempted rape
 Any victim of a criminal sexual act or an attempted criminal sexual act
 Victims of aggravated sexual abuse
 Victims of sexual abuse in the first degree

Additional sub-units of the Special Victims Division are listed below:
 Sex Offenders Monitoring Unit (SOMU): Monitors all state-designated sex offenders to ensure they are in compliance.
 Special Victims Liaison Unit (SVLU): Provides educational lectures to community and advocacy groups, schools and medical institutions concerning public as well as personal safety.
 DNA tracking unit (DNATU): Tracks and coordinates all scientific evidence relating to investigations involving sexual assault.

The television series Law & Order: Special Victims Unit describes fictionalizations of some of the Special Victims Division's cases.

Major Case Squad
 Commanding Officer of Major Case Squad – Deputy Inspector  

The Major Case Squad, which is a unit within the Special Investigation Division of the New York City Police Department Detective Bureau, is located at One Police Plaza in Manhattan. It handles the following cases:
 Kidnappings as directed by the Chief of Detectives
 Burglary or attempted burglary of a bank or bank safe
 Larceny by extortion or attempt, from a bank
 Robbery or attempted robbery of a bank by a perpetrator not armed
 Burglary of a truck contents over $100,000
 Larceny of a truck contents over $100,000
 Robbery of a truck and contents by hijacking
 All robberies in warehouse depots or similar locations where the objects of the crime are a truck or its contents
 All commercial burglaries in which the value of the property stolen exceeds $100,000

Unlike the fictional Major Case Squad as depicted in Law & Order: Criminal Intent, the squad does not investigate homicides.

Real Time Crime Center

Commanding Officer of Real Time Crime Center: Deputy Inspector - Janice Holmes  

Located on the second floor of Police Headquarters, at One Police Plaza, the Real Time Crime Center is essentially a data warehouse and search engine operated by a staff of detectives that assists in providing relevant and timely information to officers conducting an investigation.  The computer network stores facts about convicted persons, suspects, encounters, nicknames and items of seemingly trivial value whose correlation could assist in an investigation.  The computer network's control room can display real-time satellite and surveillance camera images and hosts a wireless link to police vehicles equipped to generate sketches at crime scenes and transmit them for comparison to stored data. It is also the central location of the Domain Awareness System.

Legal Bureau
 Commanding Officer of Legal – Deputy Commissioner Lawrence Byrne 

The NYPD Legal Bureau provides assistance to law enforcement personnel regarding department legal matters. The Legal Bureau also has a memorandum of understanding with the Manhattan DA to selectively prosecute New York City Criminal Court summons court cases, as district attorneys are legally permitted to delegate their prosecution.

The bureau comprises the Civil Enforcement Unit, Criminal Section, Civil Section, Legislative Affairs Unit, Document Production/FOIL, and the Police Action Litigation Section (PALS).

Other units

Fugitive Enforcement Division
The Fugitive Enforcement Division (FED) is a division of the NYPD charged with arresting fugitives across the city. They are divided into units for Manhattan South, Manhattan North, the Bronx, Queens North, Queens South, Brooklyn North, Brooklyn South, and Staten Island. The division is further divided into the Warrant Squads, and Violent Felony Apprehension Squads. The members of FED are often tasked with arresting highly-dangerous suspects of serious crimes and as such FED is one of the most dangerous units to be assigned to.  Due to the cross-jurisdictional and similar natures of their work, FED often works in conjunction with the U.S. Marshals and various other state and local agencies.

Anti-Crime Unit
Anti-Crime Unit was a unit that is located in all precincts, transit districts (TD), and housing police service areas (PSA). These officers perform patrol services work in their respective command. They are generally tasked differently from a typical uniformed patrol unit. Unlike uniformed patrol units whose main goal is to provide a visible presence in the streets in an effort to deter crime, Anti-Crime Unit specializes in undercover operations and tries to avoid detection in an effort to spot criminals during criminal activity in order to arrest them. Anti-Crime officers, unlike patrol units, are not required to handle typical radio runs, such as accidents, disputes, and general policing calls that uniformed officers are called on for a majority of their jobs. Anti-Crime officers are typically tasked with finding felony suspects, such as those possessing weapons, or committing recurring crimes in the area. If a certain crime is spiking in an area, such as burglary, Anti-Crime officers will be tasked with finding those responsible, usually through following the suspects. They are proactive rather than reactive.

To find street criminals it is important for Anti-Crime officers to not be easily spotted. Anti-Crime officers therefore typically wear plainclothes that match the clothing common to the area. They will always patrol in unmarked vehicles, that cannot be identified at first glance. Some vehicles are simply street appearance editions of standard police vehicles such as the Ford Crown Victoria, Chevrolet Impala, and Ford Taurus. However, they can also use vehicles that are not typically vehicles used by law enforcement, including Honda Accords, Jeep Cherokees, and others. These officers sometimes work in uniform depending on the nature of their assignment.

In the past, Anti-Crime functions were conducted by the citywide Street Crimes Unit. However, after several police-involved shootings and notoriety for its aggressive tactics, it was disbanded and replaced by Anti-Crime units that serve the same purpose but fall under the command of the special operations sergeants, lieutenants, or captains in their respective precincts. The anti-crime units were disbanded in 2020. The 600 cops would be transferred to Detective Bureau and Neighborhood Policing.

Eric Adams, mayor-elect of New York City, pledged to reinstate the unit in 2021 to deal with the city's rising problem of gun violence.

Technical Assistance Response Unit
Established in 1998 under the name "TARU", it was formerly known as the Tech Services Unit, originally established in 1972.

Commanding Officer of Technical Assistance Response Unit (TARU): ?

The Technical Assistance Response Unit (TARU) provides investigative technical equipment and tactical support to all bureaus within the department. In addition, they also provide assistance to other city, state, and federal agencies. The unit also deals with several forms of computer forensics. The unit is based in NYPD headquarters at One Police Plaza.

Movie and Television Unit
Founded in 1966, the NYPD Movie/TV Unit was the first of its kind in the country. Because of its relationship with the NYPD, the unit has the greatest knowledge on how to assist productions, particularly with complex shooting situations, in a city that is dense with vehicular and pedestrian traffic.

Whether it conducts filming on bridges, highways, or busy intersections, the unit controls traffic to ensure that companies can get shots that may otherwise be impossible. It also oversees staged "crime scenes" used in the filming of the city's many police-related shows, such as Law & Order and Third Watch. The unit's responsibilities do not end there; the unit also monitors child work permits, stunts, prop firearms, placement of equipment, pedestrian safety, and parking.

While filming on busy New York City streets presents countless challenges, the unit has, over the years, developed a strong working relationship with the film industry. The unit makes an effort to ensure that New York City remains a popular location for filming.

Until the election of Mayor Rudolph Giuliani in 1994, the unit occasionally assisted with pornographic productions. But Giuliani put a stop to this as part of his effort to clean up the streets of New York City. In 1997, porn producer Michael Lucas filed a lawsuit against the Police Department and Giuliani citing discriminating practices used by the Movie/TV Unit against porn productions. The lawsuit was dismissed in September 1998 when a district judge granted a motion to dismiss on behalf of the NYPD.

Evidence Collection Teams
The Evidence Collection Teams are tasked with the collection of evidence at crime scenes in their respective boroughs that are not determined to be at the level necessary to require the Crime Scene Unit. Each patrol borough (Manhattan South, Manhattan North, Bronx, Staten Island, Queens North, Queens South, Brooklyn North, and Brooklyn South) has their own Evidence Collection Team under the control of the respective borough commander. The Evidence Collection Teams are staffed by police officers, sergeants and usually headed by a Lieutenant.

The Evidence Collection Teams were started in Manhattan South by Lt. James Robert (Ret.) to take some of the pressure off the Crime Scene Unit and the precinct detective squads by forming a forensic unit to bridge the gap between precinct latent print officers and the Crime Scene Unit. The Evidence Collection Team processes crime scenes pertaining to burglaries, robberies, assaults where the victim is not likely to die, felonious larcenies and other crimes as directed by the duty captain.

Many of the police officers that originally started in the Evidence Collection Team have gone on to transfer to the Crime Scene Unit and become detectives. This transfer is difficult, due to the change from the Patrol Services Bureau to the Detective Bureau, as well as the fact that there are over 150 members of the various Evidence Collection Teams usually vying for one or two slots in Crime Scene.

Although Crime Scene is expected to handle many of the newsworthy or high-profile cases in the city, quite often the Manhattan South Evidence Collection Team is called out to jobs in the Midtown Manhattan area that involve celebrities and wind up on the cover of national newspapers. Recent examples of this include the shooting involving Remy Ma (the rapper) as well as the incident involving Sean "Puffy" Combs and Jennifer Lopez in December 1999.

School Safety Division

 Commanding Officer of School Safety Division: Deputy Chief - Marlon O. Larin  / Executive Officer: Inspector - Kevin L. Taylor 

The School Safety Division is the school police force for New York City Department of Education schools. The agency is a division of the New York City Police Department Community Affairs Bureau, and is one of the largest law enforcement agencies in New York City.

Cadet Corps

 Commanding Officer of Cadet Corps Unit: Lieutenant - Khagay Ruvinov 

The New York City Police Department Cadet Corps is a form of internship with the New York City Police Department. The program is open to New York City residents who are enrolled in college and have completed 15 or more credits. Residents who have not yet completed a 15 credit requirement are able to join under certain circumstances.

Paid Detail Unit
 Commanding Officer of Paid Detail Unit – Captain Carlos A. Fernandez 

The Paid Detail Unit is a program within the New York City Police Department allowing private corporations to hire NYPD police officers for security duties. The program was introduced in 1998, allowing off-duty officers to wear their uniforms while earning money in second jobs at sports venues, financial institutions and other places of business.

Chaplains Unit
 Commanding Officer of the Chaplains Unit - Lieutenant Steven A. Jerome 
 Chief Chaplain of the New York Police Department - Chief (Chaplain) Rabbi Dr. Alvin Kass 
Assistant Chief Chaplain of the New York Police Department - Assistant Chief (Chaplain) Monsignor Robert J. Romano 
The Chaplains Unit is made up of the police chaplains of the New York City Police Department. The chaplains wear the uniform of the NYPD, with added insignia of their faith group, but do not have police powers. There are currently twelve chaplains representing various faiths.

Ceremonial Unit
The Ceremonial Unit is a guard of honour for special services in the program within the New York City Police Department. Specializing in drill and ceremony, it often posts the colours at certain events and marches in a platoon formation during parades and ceremonies. Pallbearers from the unit also on occasion escort the coffin of police officers who die in the line of duty at their funerals.

 Commanding Officer of the Ceremonial Unit - Lieutenant Jamel Hodges

Police Band

The Band of the City of New York Police Department (commonly branded as the NYPD Police Band) the primary musical unit of the NYPD. Composed of 70 members, it is part of the Ceremonial Unit and likewise performs at community ceremonies and parades. The ensembles of the band include a Marching Band, a Percussion Ensemble, a Jazz Ensemble and a Steel Drum Ensemble.

 Commanding Officer of the Police Band - Lieutenant Tony Giorgio

Pipes & Drums 
The NYPD Pipes and Drums is a unit composed of active and retired NYPD officers, with funding and sponsorship coming from the Irish-American Emerald Society organization. It has become one of the main proponents of Irish tradition and culture in the city and state. It is an annual participant in the St. Patrick’s Day parade on Fifth Avenue and the Inaugural parade in the capital of Washington.

See also

 New York City Police Department
 New York City Sheriff's Office
 New York State Police
 List of law enforcement agencies in New York
 New York City Police Commissioner
 New York City Police Department Highway Patrol
 New York City Police Department Auxiliary Police
 New York City Police Department School Safety
 New York City Police Department Cadet Corps
 New York City Housing Authority Police Department
 New York City Transit Police
 NYPD Rodman's Neck Firing Range
 New York City Police Foundation
 New York City Civilian Complaint Review Board
 Real time crime center
 Police memorabilia collecting
 Thomas F. Byrnes

References

New York City Police Department
New York City Police Department